Lillian Negrón Colón is a Puerto Rican educator and university administrator. She became president of Bayamón Central University in 2010. Negrón Colón served 16 years as dean of the college of education at Pontifical Catholic University of Puerto Rico.

Early life and education 
Negrón Colón was born in Ponce, Puerto Rico to Aida Luz Colón and Francisco Negrón. She is the oldest of six siblings. Negrón Colón completed a B.S. in elementary education with a focus on special education and a M.S. in education at Pontifical Catholic University of Puerto Rico. She earned a Ph.D. in early education with a focus in curriculum and instruction from Pennsylvania State University. Her 1990 dissertation was titled The relationship between the home environment and self-perceptions of competence in young children.

Career 
Negrón Colón started her career as a special education teacher. , she worked for the Pontifical Catholic University of Puerto Rico (PUCPR) for 20 years including two years as the director of the department of elementary education. She was later the dean of the college of education for 16 years. In September 2010, Negrón Colón became president of Bayamón Central University.

She assisted the Puerto Rico Department of Education and as an external evaluator of federal education programs. In 2002, she served on the Governor Sila María Calderón's advisory committee to revise the commonwealth's education policy pertaining to teacher certification. In 2009, she was nominated y Carlos E. Chardón to serve on the Universitario del Secretario de Educación advisory committee (CAUSE). Between 2012 and 2014, she served on the board of directors of the Organization of Latin American Catholic Universities (ODUCAL) and is the deputy vice president of the region including Mexico, Central America, and the Caribbean. She is the first woman to hold a position on the ODUCAL board of directors. She is the first vice president of the government's board of  Association of Private Colleges and Universities of Puerto Rico (ACUP) and the president of the government's board of the Liga Atlética Interuniversitaria de Puerto Rico.

Awards and honors 
In 2015, Negrón Colón was recognized by the municipality of Ponce as a "mujer distinguida" .

Personal life 
Negrón Colón is married to Orlando L. Rivera Quiñones, a professor. She has a daughter who is a medical psychiatrist. Negrón Colón has two grandchildren.

See also 

 List of women presidents or chancellors of co-ed colleges and universities

References 

Living people
Year of birth missing (living people)
Educators from Ponce
21st-century Puerto Rican educators
20th-century Puerto Rican educators
Women heads of universities and colleges
Heads of universities and colleges in the United States
Education school deans
American university and college faculty deans
Women deans (academic)
Penn State College of Education alumni
Pontifical Catholic University of Puerto Rico alumni
Pontifical Catholic University of Puerto Rico faculty
20th-century women educators
21st-century American women educators
21st-century American educators
20th-century American women